Ouvrage Gordolon is a work (gros ouvrage) of the Maginot Line's Alpine extension, the Alpine Line, also known as the Little Maginot Line. Gordolon was built by Borie contractors at a cost of 21.4 million francs. Work started in November 1931 and was completed in April 1934.

Description 
Ouvrage Gordolon was planned to control the road through Roquebilliėre in coordination with Ouvrage Flaut. Both ouvrages are unusual for the Alps in having anti-tank guns, which were more commonly used in main Maginot Line in the more favorable tank country of northeastern France. The compact plan was laid out on two levels, with a planned expansion of the barracks never carried out.
Block 1 (entry): one machine gun cloche and one machine gun embrasure. 
Block 2 (infantry): one machine gun cloche, one twin heavy machine gun cloche, one grenade launcher cloche, one machine gun/47mm anti-tank gun embrasure and two 81mm mortar embrasures.
Block 3 (infantry): one machine gun cloche, two twin heavy machine gun cloches, one observation cloche, two 75mm gun embrasures and two 81mm mortar embrasures.

A fourth block was planned as a casemate with two heavy machine gun embrasures, but not built. Two observation posts included the post at Pas d'Albéras.

See also 
 List of Alpine Line ouvrages

References

Bibliography 
Allcorn, William. The Maginot Line 1928-45. Oxford: Osprey Publishing, 2003. 
Kaufmann, J.E. and Kaufmann, H.W. Fortress France: The Maginot Line and French Defenses in World War II, Stackpole Books, 2006. 
Kaufmann, J.E., Kaufmann, H.W., Jancovič-Potočnik, A. and Lang, P. The Maginot Line: History and Guide, Pen and Sword, 2011. 
Mary, Jean-Yves; Hohnadel, Alain; Sicard, Jacques. Hommes et Ouvrages de la Ligne Maginot, Tome 1. Paris, Histoire & Collections, 2001.  
Mary, Jean-Yves; Hohnadel, Alain; Sicard, Jacques. Hommes et Ouvrages de la Ligne Maginot, Tome 4 - La fortification alpine. Paris, Histoire & Collections, 2009.  
Mary, Jean-Yves; Hohnadel, Alain; Sicard, Jacques. Hommes et Ouvrages de la Ligne Maginot, Tome 5. Paris, Histoire & Collections, 2009.

External links 
 Gordolon (gros ouvrage) at fortiff.be 
  L'ouvrage de Gordolon, photos, maps and infos  at wikimaginot.eu 
 Ouvrage Gordolon at Subterranea Britannica

GORD
Maginot Line
Alpine Line